William Duncan Smith (January 4, 1899 – April 1, 1977) was a Canadian politician. He served in the Legislative Assembly of British Columbia from 1945 to 1949  from the electoral district of Atlin, a member of the Coalition government.

References

1899 births
1977 deaths